Brandis Corner is a village on the A3072 within the civil parish of Holsworthy in Devon, England.

In the Cornish dialect, a brandis is a three-legged stool made of iron, or a three-cornered rest used for a kettle. In Devonshire, the name has been used for places shaped like this article e.g. Brandis Corner, and Brandis Lane near Crediton (Source: p336 in Journal of the Royal Institution of Cornwall Volume IX 1886-1889 - published in 1889.)

Villages in Devon